The men's team pursuit competition at the 2018 European Speed Skating Championships was held on 7 January 2018.

Results
The race was started at 16:19.

References

Men's team pursuit